The terms Rhinelandic, Rhenish, and Rhinelandic regiolect refer to the vernacular lect spoken in the so-called Rhineland of West Germany. This linguistic region is approximately formed of the West of North Rhine-Westphalia, the North of Rhineland-Palatinate and several smaller adjacent areas, including some areas in neighbouring countries.

Although there is such a thing as a Rhinelandic accent, and the regiolect uses it, the Rhinelandic variety is not simply German spoken with an accent. Indeed, it differs from Standard German in several thousand commonly used additional words, phrases, and idioms, and some grammatical constructions. Like other German regiolects, there is not a strict definition of what constitutes Rhinelandic; it can be spoken in a way very close to the standard idiom, but if locals talk to each other, it is mostly unintelligible to inhabitants of other German-speaking regions.

Linguists classify the Rhinelandic regiolect as a dialectal variety of Standard German having a strong substratum of the many diverse local community languages of the Rhineland. As such, it occupies a middle position between the group of older West Central German languages, and Low Franconian languages spoken in the Rhineland, and the newer Standard German. The latter has only been brought into the area recently, under the Prussian reign, when local speakers merged many common properties and words of their local languages into the standard language. Thus a new regiolect formed, which in many respects follows the conventions of Standard German, but at the same time continues local linguistic traditions, making it comprehensible in a much wider area than the original local languages. Nevertheless, it still reflects differences inside the dialect continuum of the Rhineland, since speakers often prefer distinct words, styles or linguistic forms depending on the subregion they come from.

Scientific recognition and documentation 
Differing across subregions of the Rhineland, and continually evolving, the Rhinelandic regiolect is not easily formalized. Though spoken by millions, it is rarely written down, which hampers scientific treatment. It has long been regarded as 'sheer colloquial speech' by the scientific community, valued too low to be subject of serious recognition and research. Only recently has it shifted into the focus of empirical research of some linguists.

Scientists of today's  have observed, documented, and researched lingual development in the Rhine Province, and lately the Rhineland, for about two hundred years.
During the past decades, they have published several studies of the current regiolect, as well as scientific books and papers, popular science books, articles and essays. Some of their findings are available on the internet. They regularly make surveys based on printed questionnaires which more recently can also be obtained and submitted via e-mail. These surveys are supplemented, extended, and updated by use of their interactive website  (Cooperative Dictionary of the Rhinelandic Colloquial Language) since 2007.

Literature on colloquialisms and colloquial German generally lists words and phrases coming from the Rhineland, marking their regional provenience appropriately.

Despite obviously not having heen created for this purpose and not including regiolect references at all, the well-known extensive multi-volume compendium  is nevertheless usually very helpful for finding hints to the probable meanings of words of the Rhinelandic regiolect that cannot be determined from other sources. They usually bear identical, related, or quite similar meanings.

Grammatical and syntactical deviations from Standard German 
 Two of the important and most eye-catching characteristics of Rhinelandic are the progressive tense and the so-called "possessive dative", both of which do not exist in the standard language. Rhinelandic constructs progressive forms with the verb "to be", the preposition "am" (= "at the", a Standard German contraction of an dem) and the infinitive, e.g. "Ich bin am Warten" (literally: I am at the waiting) is equivalent to English "I am waiting", cf. Dutch "Ik ben aan het wachten" (there is no corresponding contraction nor a German-like case system in Dutch). The possessive-dative construction replaces the standard genitive. The possessor is named in the dative case, followed by a possessive pronoun, e.g. "der alten Frau ihr Mann" (literally: to the old woman her husband), which is equivalent to English "the old woman's husband". The following exemplary sentence features both a progressive verb construction and a possessive dative. Sentences like this are common in the Rhinelandic parlance, but often not easy to understand for German speakers unfamiliar with it.
{| class="wikitable"
| Rhinelandic || Dä || Peter || is || - || dem || Manfred || sein || Farrad || am || Repariern
|-
| Dutch || [] ||  ||  || - || [] ||  ||  ||  ||  || 
|-
| Standard German || [] ||  || - ||  || [] ||  || - ||  || - || -
|-
| English || [] ||  ||  || || [] ||  || - ||  || - || -
|}

 is the literal Dutch translation of Rhinelandic dem as used with masculine nouns, not Standard German  as used with masculine nouns, which would be .

 There is different use of some prepositions and declensions or grammatical cases:
{| class="wikitable"
| Rhinelandic || - ||colspan="2" align="center"| komma || bei || mich || 
|-
| Standard German ||  ||  ||  ||  ||  ||
|-
| English ||  ||  || - ||  ||  ||
|}
 The regiolect sometimes uses a different auxiliary verb to build the past tenses. Most commonly, "vergessen" ("to forget") and "anfangen" ("to begin") take the auxiliary "sein" ("to be") instead of "haben" ("to have"). This is the case especially in the Low Franconian area and makes sentences appear closer to Dutch than to German.
{| class="wikitable"
| Rhinelandic || ich || bin || dat || ganz || vergessen
|-
| Dutch ||  ||  ||  ||  || 
|-
| Standard German ||  ||  ||  ||  || 
|-
| English ||  ||  ||  ||  || 
|}
{| class="wikitable"
| Rhinelandic || ich || bin || dat || ganz || vergessen || gewesen
|-
| Dutch ||  ||  ||  ||  ||  || -
|-
| Standard German ||  ||  ||  ||  ||  || -
|-
| English ||  ||  ||  ||  ||  || -
|}
 Another phenomenon shared with Dutch is separation of "da + preposition" (dafür; damit = for that; with that). Standard German never splits this construction up, but in Rhinelandic and Dutch it is most common to do so. In this case, Rhinelandic "da" can be placed anywhere in the sentence, the preposition must follow at (or towards) the end of the sentence.
{| class="wikitable"
| Rhinelandic || Ich || hab || da || kein(e) || Zeit || für || - 
|-
| Dutch ||  ||  ||  ||  ||  ||  || - 
|-
| Standard German ||  ||  ||  ||  ||  || - || - 
|-
| English ||  ||  || - ||  ||  ||  ||   
|}
 Individual expressions reflect dialectal usage, which also may lead to similarities with Dutch.
{| class="wikitable"
| Rhinelandic || du || has || den || colspan="2" align="center"|  || -
|-
| Dutch ||  ||  ||  ||colspan="2" align="center"|  || -
|-
| Standard German ||  ||  ||  ||colspan="2" align="center"|  || -
|-
| English ||  ||  || → ||colspan="2" align="center"|  or  || → 
|}
 Names of persons, and denominators of roles and social positions are almost always preceded by grammatical articles. References to females, and especially to young females, may  decline with the neuter grammatical gender (which is not at all pejorative). Using articles with personal names is wrong in Standard German, but is normal not only in Rhinelandic but also in most dialects and colloquial varieties of German in central and southern Germany, as well as in Austria and Switzerland.
{| class="wikitable"
| Rhinelandic || es/et/das/dat/de/die || Lisa || heirat || graad
|-
| Standard German || [] || Lisa ||  || 
|-
| English || [] || Lisa ||  || 
|}
{| class="wikitable"
| Rhinelandic || es/et/das/dat/de/die || Lisa || is || am || heiratn
|-
| Standard German || [] || Lisa ||colspan="3" align="center"|  
|-
| English || [] || Lisa ||  ||colspan="2" align="center"| 
|}
{| class="wikitable"
|colspan="2"| Rhinelandic || et || kütt || : || dä || Schmitz ||, || die || Schmitz ||, || un || - || et || Schmitz
|-
|rowspan="2"| Standard German || (literally) ||  ||  || : ||  ||  ||, ||  ||  || ||  || - ||  || 
|-
| (better) ||  ||  || ||colspan="5" align="center"|    || ||  || - ||colspan="2" align="center"| 
|-
|rowspan="2"| English || (literally) ||  ||  || : ||  ||  ||, ||  ||  ||, ||  || - ||  || 
|-
| (better) || - ||  || : ||colspan="2" align="center"|  ||  ||colspan="2" align="center"|  || ||  ||  ||colspan="2" align="center"| 
|}
 People talk about themselves in the third person in specific contexts, also with articles. This can be done in English, too, but not in correct Standard German. For example, a mother addressing her child:
{| class="wikitable"
| Rhinelandic || - ||colspan="2" align="center"| hasse || - || schön || geputz ||, || da || muss || de || Mamma || - || nich || mehr || bei || [gehn] || - ||
|-
| Standard German ||  ||  ||  || [] ||  ||  ||,   || - || → ||colspan="2" align="center"|  || - ||  || [] ||colspan="2" align="center"|  || → ||
|-
| English ||  ||  || || [] ||  || ||,  || - || → ||colspan="2" align="center"|  /  ||  → ||  ||  ||colspan="2" align="center"|  || - ||
|}

Intermediate position between Standard German and broad dialect 

The following exemplary sentences may show how the regiolect is related to both Standard German and the actual dialect (Kölsch in this case), and found to be in the middle between the two.

The example shows that the regiolect is based on Standard German. Thus, it uses ers'ma ("first") from the standard "erst mal" (vs. dialect: eesch ens), and schonn ("already") from the standard "schon" (vs. dialect: att or allt). With words common to both languages, vowel and consonant qualities are usually those of the standard (trinken instead of drinke; immer instead of emmer), as are the rules of morphology.

However, the strong dialectal influence is also evident: Word final t/d is often deleted after another consonant (jetz, un); there is a tendency towards vowel shortening (schonn, widder); some structure words come in the dialectal form (mer = "wir"; et = "es, das"); and words with an initial vowel are not separated from the preceding word by a glottal stop, but rather linked to it, like in English. (This is marked in the example by an underscore.)
The regiolect also uses diminutives more often (Käffchen instead of "Kaffee"), and has borrowed from the dialect many syntactical constructions unknown in the standard, e.g. mer trinken uns (en Käffchen), literally "we drink (a coffee) to ourselves", meaning: "to drink something with ease and pleasure."

Another good example is the word "afternoon", for which the regiolect uses a form similar to the dialect, but has adapted a vowel and a consonant to the standard.

The continuum Rhenish dialects – Rhenish regiolect – Standard German is comparable (however not wholly equal) to the continuum Scots – (colloquial) Scottish English – British Standard English in Lowland Scotland. The first end of the continuum is made up by the traditional regional language, which is closely related to the standard, but has had its independent development for several centuries; in both cases, it is alive, but losing ground in everyday communication, especially among younger people. The other end of the continuum is the supra-regional standard language used for example on national television. In between the two, we find the new common speech, which is based on the standard, but has a strong substratum from the traditional language.

Regional differences 
The Rhinelandic regiolect has several regional and subregional features. Very many approximately coincide with the general dialect groups found in the local languages. For example:

{| class="wikitable"
! English || German || Rhinelandic(North) || Rhinelandic(Center) || Rhinelandic(South)
|-
! little jar
|align="center"| Gefäß
|align="center"| Kümpken
|align="center"| Kümpche(n)
|align="center"| Kimpche
| 
|}
As usual, the Low Franconian area in the North uses their own way to build the diminutive. The Central Rhineland between the Benrath line and the Sankt Goar line usually has an intermediate position. In this instance, the South uses their own vocalism that already incorporates parts of the Palatinate German one, found even further South.

Rhinelandic influences on Standard German 
Like other jargons and regional varieties, also the Rhinelandic is influencing the Vocabulary of the German Standard. Instances of more recent additions are:
 Knöllchen − a (parking or similar) ticket 
 Poppen − to have sexual intercourse 
 Sie sind sich nicht eins − they do not agree − instead of German: .  Compare Dutch Zij zijn het niet eens.
 kungeln, Klüngel, rheinische Lösung (rhinelandic solution) − all three understood in the narrowed sense of corruption in office, nepotism, and the like. 
 Schiss haben − to be afraid or anxious; to feel threatened; to be in sorrow about something.  (This expression is also in widespread use in Low German)

A grammatical deviation too, the am-Progressive mentioned above, has invaded the colloquial speech of other parts of the German-speaking areas. Experts state that it can be seen as "almost standard language use in wide parts."

Bibliography 
 Dr. Georg Cornelissen:  Greven Verlag, Köln 2005, 
 Peter Honnen: Kappes, Knies und Klüngel. . Greven, Köln 2003, 
 
 
 
 Klaus J. Zöller: . 72 Seiten. Bruckmann, München 1974,

References

External links 

 Interactive dictionary of Rhinelandic (German)
 Sound samples of Rhinelandic of the linguistic department at Institut für Landeskunde und Regionalgeschichte of the Landschaftsverband Rheinland (German)
 Regiolect of the Rhineland (German)
 Regional communication in the Rhineland (German)
 Rhinelandic Expressions (German)

There are several sound samples of spoken Rhinelandic at the linguistic department at Institut für Landeskunde und Regionalgeschichte of the  Landschaftsverband Rheinland:
 Adenauerdeutsch (Excerpt of an official statement of the German administration by chancellor Konrad Adenauer)
 Actress Sammy Orfgen of Cologne talking (see also: Samy Orfgen, Cologne)
 Rhinelandically accented Standard German from Bonn (Bonn)
 Regiolect from Rheinhausen (from Duisburg-Rheinhausen, at the left bank of the river Rhine)
 Regiolect and Standard German from Stotzheim in the Eifel (see also: Stotzheim)

Languages of Germany